Huangbeiling (Chinese: 黄贝岭) is an area and former village in Luohu, Shenzhen, China. It was named after the neighbouring Huangbei Hill and the village dates back more than 650 years.

See also
Huangbeiling Station, the Shenzhen Metro Station serving the area

References

Geography of Shenzhen